Wilson Bridge, also known as Old Royster Ford and Carroll County Bridge No. 121, is a historic Pratt through truss bridge that spans Deer Creek and is located in Deer Creek Township, Carroll County, Indiana. It was built by the Lafayette Bridge Company in 1897–1898.  It measures 122 feet long and 14 feet high.

It was listed on the National Register of Historic Places in 2001. It is located in the Deer Creek Valley Rural Historic District.

References

External links

Road bridges on the National Register of Historic Places in Indiana
Bridges completed in 1898
Transportation buildings and structures in Carroll County, Indiana
National Register of Historic Places in Carroll County, Indiana
Historic district contributing properties in Indiana
Pratt truss bridges in the United States
Metal bridges in the United States
Delphi, Indiana